Sanhe Subdistrict is a subdistrict in Fengdu County, Chongqing, China. , it has 16 residential communities and 7 villages under its administration.

See also 
 List of township-level divisions of Chongqing

References 

Township-level divisions of Chongqing
Fengdu County